The Israeli Technological and Logistics Directorate (acronym: Atal) is a directorate in the General Staff of the Israel Defense Forces, responsible for its logistics responses and tasks, and in particular: the building of military bases, maintaining a medical infrastructure during peacetime and times of war and emergencies, caring for the nutrition of soldiers, as well as for the fuel and maintenance of the managerial and military vehicle fleet of the IDF.

The Directorate is the third manifestation of the Technological and Logistics Directorate, overseeing the Logistics Corps, which saw many of its units and much of its authority transferred to the Ground Forces. During an emergency, the directorate is also responsible for the deployment of most non-combat reserve units. As of 2012, it is headed by Aluf Kobi Barak.

History

The directorate was created in February 1948 as the Quartermasters Directorate and renamed to Supply Directorate in 1972. In 1997 it was renamed to Technological and Logistics Directory, and in 2006 to Logistics, Medical, and the Centers Directorate. In 2008 the name was changed back to its current name.

Commanders

External links

 Official site 

Military units and formations of Israel
Military medicine in Israel
Military logistics of Israel
Israel Defense Forces directorates